Ion Munteanu (7 June 1955 – 24 March 2006) was a Romanian footballer who played as a left back for Autobuzul București, Sportul Studențesc București and Chimia Râmnicu Vâlcea. He died in 2006 because of cirrhosis.

International career
Ion Munteanu played 23 matches at international level for Romania, making his debut on 14 October 1979 under coach Constantin Cernăianu in a friendly which ended with a 3–1 loss against the Soviet Union. He played two games at the Euro 1980 qualifiers, seven at the 1982 World Cup qualifiers and two at the successful 1977–80 Balkan Cup. He also played one match for Romania's Olympic team.

Honours
Sportul Studenţesc
Balkans Cup: 1979–80
Cupa României runner-up: 1978–79
Romania
Balkan Cup: 1977–80

References

External links
 

1955 births
2006 deaths
Romanian footballers
Olympic footballers of Romania
Romania international footballers
Association football defenders
Liga I players
Liga II players
AFC Rocar București players
FC Sportul Studențesc București players
Chimia Râmnicu Vâlcea players